The Terminal Station in Hutchinson, Kansas is a Prairie School style building built in 1915.  It was listed on the National Register of Historic Places in 1983.

It was built as a station of the Wichita-based Arkansas Valley Interurban trolley-car system.

In 1983, its first floor was a Trailways Bus station and its second floor was unused.

References

Railway stations on the National Register of Historic Places in Kansas
Buildings and structures in Reno County, Kansas
Railway stations in the United States opened in 1915
National Register of Historic Places in Reno County, Kansas
Bus stations on the National Register of Historic Places
Former railway stations in Kansas
Hutchinson,_Kansas